Bangerang is a locality near Warracknabeal in Victoria, Australia.

The township had a Mutual Improvement Association, Red Cross Society branch and a primary school. Local residents could join the Rifle Club,  Cricket Club or go to the public library.

References

Towns in Victoria (Australia)
Wimmera